Jack Nolan is an Irish actor, known for his role as Michael Hennessy on the Virgin drama series  Red Rock (2015-2018) and Will Noble on the BBC medical drama Casualty (2019–2021).

Filmography

Awards and nominations

References

External links
 

21st-century Irish male actors
Irish male film actors
Irish male stage actors
Irish male television actors
Living people
Year of birth missing (living people)